Paddington Green may refer to:

 Paddington Green, London, a location in north-east Westminster, London, United Kingdom
 Paddington Green Police Station, a police station in Paddington, London, United Kingdom
 Paddington Green (TV series), a UK television series based in Paddington, London, United Kingdom

See also
 Paddington (disambiguation)